The 2008 Qatar Ladies Open singles was the singles event of the 2008 Qatar Ladies Open, a WTA Tier I tennis tournament held in February. Justine Henin was the defending champion, but she chose not to participate that year.

Maria Sharapova won in the final 6–1, 2–6, 6–0, against Vera Zvonareva.

Seeds
The top eight seeds receive a bye into the second round.

Draw

Finals

Top half

Section 1

Section 2

Bottom half

Section 3

Section 4

External links
Draw and Qualifying draw

References

2008 Qatar Ladies Open - 1
2008 WTA Tour
2008 in Qatari sport